Beltaine's Fire was a five-member hip hop/folk-rock/Celtic fusion collective from the San Francisco Bay Area in California fronted by Emcee Lynx.  Their music evolved considerably over the years.  Starting out as a mix of "traditional Irish and Scottish music with rock, folk, and rap elements"., they described themselves as "folk-rap" and their last album was primarily hip hop, albeit with elements borrowed from Latin, world, American folk, Celtic trad, funk, jazz, and rock.   

They self-released three studio albums and one live album and played more than 300 shows at venues of all sizes all over California as well as parts of the East Coast. Their largest appearance was the 2008 KVMR Celtic Festival, one of the largest Celtic music festivals on the West Coast with over 10,000 annual attendees.

History
The band was originally formed in San Francisco, California in August 2005 as a collaboration between Emcee Lynx and an experimental Celtic/Folk/Rock Duo called The Wills Wilde. After some initial success they decided to build a live band around the concept and Lynx recruited Laura Noel on Bass and Chris Darbeyshire on drums to make the group a quintet. In January 2006 Lynx, Laura, and Chris decided to go their own way but kept the name Beltaine’s Fire.  Beltaine’s Fire continued on as a progressive hip hop trio for the better part of a year until meeting up with John “The Electrician” Dougal in late 2006 and recruiting him, along with Michael Mullen of Tempest, to play on their first album, The Weapon of the Future which was released in 2007. 

John joined the band full-time in January 2007 playing a custom modified electric Banjo. In August of that year Chris left the band and was replaced by Todd “Cozy T” Snyderman, formerly of Groundsick Productions, on drums. Kater “K8R” Murch also joined on Cello and Mandolin.  They released their second album, Liberty, in August 2008. Todd & Kater left the band shortly afterwards to pursue a new project together. 

For their third album, Anarchitecture, they added Steven May on Mandolin and Fiddle and Cadence Myles on Drums. Anarchitecture was released on August 31, 2011 through the band's Bandcamp site.

Band line-up

Members
Emcee Lynx: Rap Vocals 2005-2012 (all albums)
Laura Noel: Electric Bass 2005-2012 (all albums)
John Dougal: Electric Banjo 2005-2012 (all albums)
Steve May: Fiddle & Mandolin 2010-2012 (Anarchitecture)
Cadence Myles: Drums 2010-2012 (Anarchitecture)
Todd "Cozy T." Snyderman: Drums 2007-2010 (Liberty)
Kater "Docta" Murch: Cello, Mandolin 2007-2010 (Liberty)
Chris Darbeyshire: Drums 2005-2007 (The Weapon of the Future)

Discography

Studio albums
The Weapon of the Future (2007)
Liberty (2008)
Anarchitecture (2011)

Demo albums
Live at Puck's (2009)

Compilations
Best of KVMR Celtic Fest''', Benefit for KVMR. (2009)The Sound of Resistance, Volume 1'' (2012)

References

External links
Bandcamp site
Official website (archive copy)

Celtic hip hop musicians
Celtic fusion musicians
Musical groups established in 2005